Stefan Meyer (born July 20, 1985) is a Canadian former professional ice hockey winger who played in the National Hockey League (NHL) with the Florida Panthers and Calgary Flames.

Playing career
Meyer grew up in the small village of Fox Valley, Saskatchewan. He played his early years of minor hockey in the neighbouring community of Richmound, Saskatchewan. He was a noticeable talent throughout his minor hockey career in Richmound, where he played alongside future Medicine Hat Tigers teammate goaltender Matt Keetley.

Later, Meyer attended school in Wilcox, Saskatchewan, where he played for the Notre Dame Hounds at the Bantam AAA and Midget AAA levels. While attending school at Athol Murray College of Notre Dame, Meyer was roommates with current NHL Defenceman Braydon Coburn. The pair were drafted 1st and 2nd overall in the 2000 Western Hockey League Bantam Draft, with Braydon Coburn going first to the Portland Winter Hawks and Meyer second to the Medicine Hat Tigers.

Meyer starred for the Tigers during his WHL career and was a key contributor on their 2003-04 WHL championship team that eventually went on to lose in the Memorial Cup final to the host Kelowna Rockets squad.

Meyer was drafted 55th overall in the 2003 NHL Entry Draft by the Florida Panthers, and played his first NHL game in 2007. Meyer was traded to the Phoenix Coyotes for Steven Reinprecht on June 19, 2009.

Meyer signed a two-year contract with the Calgary Flames on July 20, 2010.

After playing only 6 games with the Calgary Flames AHL affiliate, the Abbotsford Heat during the 2011-12 season, Meyer was transferred to Farjestad BK Karlstad in the Swedish Elite League in December 2011.  During the 2011-12 season, Meyer played 25 regular season games with Farjestad recording a goal and 6 assists. In the SEL playoffs Meyer recorded 2 goals in 9 playoff games.

Since Meyer's transfer to Farjestad, he has continued playing in Europe.  For the 2012-13 season, Meyer joined the Schwenninger Wild Wings of 2nd Bundesliga, the Tier 2 league in Germany.  The following season, he moved to the Elite Ice Hockey League in the United Kingdom, joining the Sheffield Steelers and winning the league championship.  In August 2014, Meyer announced that he would play the 2014-15 season for the Braehead Clan, the team the Steelers had beat in the playoff quarterfinals the previous season.

Meyer has since started a family and retired from professional hockey and is now a power skating instructor in Medicine Hat, Alberta.

Career statistics

Regular season and playoffs

International

References

External links

1985 births
Living people
Abbotsford Heat players
Athol Murray College of Notre Dame alumni
Braehead Clan players
Calgary Flames players
Canadian ice hockey left wingers
Färjestad BK players
Florida Panthers draft picks
Florida Panthers players
Ice hockey people from Saskatchewan
Medicine Hat Tigers players
Rochester Americans players
San Antonio Rampage players
Schwenninger Wild Wings players
Sheffield Steelers players